Sport climbing (or bolted climbing) is a type of free climbing in rock climbing where the lead climber clips into pre-drilled permanent bolts for their protection while ascending the route.  Sport climbing differs from the riskier traditional climbing where the lead climber has to insert temporary protection equipment while they are ascending.

Sport climbing dates from the early 1980s when leading French rock climbers wanted to climb routes that offered no cracks or fissures in which to insert the temporary protection equipment used in traditional climbing.  While bolting natural rock faces was controversial — and remains a focus of debate in climbing ethics — sport climbing grew rapidly in popularity, and all subsequent grade milestones in rock climbing came from sport climbing.

The safer discipline of sport climbing also led to the rapid growth in competition climbing, which made its Olympic debut at the 2020 Summer Olympics.  While competition climbing consists of three distinct rock climbing disciplines lead climbing (the bolted sport climbing element), bouldering (no bolts needed), and speed climbing (also not bolted), it is sometimes confusingly also referred to as "sport climbing".

Description 

Sport climbing is a form of free climbing (i.e. no artificial or mechanical device can be used to aid progression, unlike with aid climbing), performed in pairs, where the lead climber clips into pre-drilled permanently fixed bolts for their protection while ascending.  Usually, the lead climber will use quickdraws to clip into the bolts. The second climber (or belayer), removes the quickdraws as they climb the route after the lead climber has reached the top.  

Sport climbing differs from traditional climbing which requires the lead climber to insert temporary protection equipment into the rock as they ascend, and is therefore much safer.  Sport climbing differs from free solo climbing where no climbing protection is used whatsoever. Confusingly, the sport of competition climbing, which consists of three distinct rock climbing disciplines: lead climbing (the bolted sport climbing element), bouldering (no bolts needed), and speed climbing (also not bolted), is sometimes referred to as "sport climbing".

First free ascent

Sport climbing developed the redpointing definition of what constitutes a first free ascent (FFA), which has since become the standard definition of an FFA for all climbing disciplines.  Redpointing allows for previously controversial techniques of hangdogging, headpointing, and pinkpointing (for competition lead climbing — the sport climbing component of competition climbing — and for extreme sport climbs, the quickdraws will already be attached to the bolts to make clipping in even simpler, which is known as pinkpointing).

History 

By the early 1980s, the leading rock climbers were beginning to reach the limits of existing traditional climbing protection devices.  They looked to climb blanker-looking rock faces that did not have the usual cracks and fissures that are needed in which to place traditional climbing protection.  In France, leading climbers such as Patrick Berhault and Patrick Edlinger began to pre-drill permanent bolts into the pocket-marked limestone walls of Buoux and Verdon Gorge for their protection.  These became known as "sport climbing routes" (i.e. there was none of the associated risks of traditional climbing, it was a purely sporting endeavor), with early examples such as Pichenbule  in 1980.  Around the same time at Smith Rocks in the United States, American climber Alan Watts also started to place pre-drilled bolts into routes, creating the first American sport climbs of Watts Tot , and Chain Reaction  in 1983.

The United Kingdom was more reluctant to allow bolting on natural rock surfaces, and early British sport climbers such as Jerry Moffatt and Ben Moon were forced to move to France and Germany. Bolting of external rock surfaces was also initially controversial in the US, although American sport climbing pioneer Alan Watts later recounted that American traditional climbers were as much against the "redpointing" techniques of sport climbers (i.e. continually practicing new routes before making the first free ascent), as they were against the use of bolts. Eventually, these sport climbers began to push new grade milestones far above traditional climbing grades, and the use of bolts became more accepted in outdoor climbing areas across America and Europe.

Ethics

Debates remain about the ethics of attaching permanent metal bolts on natural outdoor rock, which is also related to the broader clean climbing movement. Many climbing areas — particularly in Continental Europe — have become fully bolted.  However, many others remain emphatically non-bolted, such as Clogwyn Du'r Arddu in the United Kingdom, where only traditional climbing techniques are allowed. In the United Kingdom, the British Mountaineering Council (BMC) maintains a register of outdoor climbing areas that are suitable for bolting, and those which are to remain bolt free; in addition, the BMC offers further guidance on related issues like retro-bolting.

Equipment

Quickdraws

Sport climbing requires far less rock climbing equipment than traditional climbing as the protection is already pre-drilled into the route.  Aside from the standard equipment of lead climbing (e.g. a rope, belay device, harness, and climbing shoes), the only important other important pieces of equipment are quickdraws to clip the rope into the bolts without generating friction.  On complex sport climbing routes that don't follow a straight line, the alignment and lengths of quickdraws used are important considerations to avoid rope drag.

Bolts

The pre-drilled bolts will degrade over time — particularly in coastal areas from salt — and eventually, all sport climbs need to be re-fitted after a number of years.  The highest quality titanium bolts are too expensive to use regularly, and the next highest quality stainless steel bolts have an expected lifespan of circa 20—25 years (the cheaper plated stainless steel bolts have a shorter span); and in 2015, the American Alpine Club established an "anchor replacement fund" to help replace the bolts on America's estimated 60,000 sport climbing routes.

Notable climbs and climbers

Sport climbing routes are graded for their technical difficulty (i.e how hard is are the physical movements to ascend the route), but unlike traditional climbing routes, do not require an additional grade to reflect risk.  While there are many grading systems used in the world, the most dominant for sport-climbs are the French grading system (i.e. ... 7a, 7a+, 7b ... , 9b+, 9c), and the American grading system (i.e. 5.11d, 5.12a, 5.12b, ... , 5.15c, 5.15d).

Since the development of sport climbing in the early 1980s, all of the subsequent grade milestones (i.e. the next levels of hardest technical difficulty) in rock climbing have been set by sport climbers.

Female sport climbing was dominated in the 1980s by American climber Lynn Hill and French climber Catherine Destivelle who set new female grade milestones and also competed against each other in the first climbing competitions.

Some of the strongest-ever sport climbers were also some of the strongest-ever competition climbers, such as Adam Ondra, Lynn Hill, and Angela Eiter.  However, some of the strongest-ever sport climbers either largely ignored competition climbing, or retired early from it to focus exclusively on non-competition sport climbing, such as Wolfgang Gullich, Chris Sharma, and Josune Bereziartu.

See also

Aid climbing
Free solo climbing
Traditional climbing

References

Further reading

External links 
An exploration of the world's most impossible sport climbs and the new standards that they set, Gripped Magazine (May 2020)
Watch Adam Ondra Make History and Flash 5.15 sport climb, Gripped Magazine (July 2021}

Types of climbing
 
Sports by type
Summer Olympic sports